The Boxing competition at the 2010 Central American and Caribbean Games was held in Mayagüez, Puerto Rico. The tournament was scheduled from 23–31 July at the Coliseo Rafael A. Mangual in Mayagüez.

Medal summary

Men's events

External links

amateur-boxing

C
Events at the 2010 Central American and Caribbean Games
Boxing at the Central American and Caribbean Games